Hubert John Matthews (18 June 1889 – 28 April 1971) was archdeacon of Hampstead from 1950 to 1961; and then archdeacon Emeritus until his death.

Matthews was educated at Winchester College and St John's College, Oxford.  Matthews originally intended to pursue a legal career; and was articled to Ellis Peirs & Co.in 1911. By 1913, however, he was at Ripon College Cuddesdon preparing for ordination. He began his ecclesiastical career with a curate at St Martin-in-the-Fields then a Naval chaplain aboard . He was vicar of All Hallows, East India Docks from 1921 to 1925; and then of Christ Church, Kensington from 1925 to 1930; St Jude's, South Kensington, 1930 to 1942; of St Marylebone from 1942 to 1954; and then of St Andrew Undershaft, 1954 to 1962. He was also at various times chaplain to the Grocers' Company, rural dean of Marylebone; a prebendary of St Paul's Cathedral, and Chaplain to the Order of St John of Jerusalem.

Notes

1889 births
1971 deaths
Archdeacons of Hampstead
Alumni of St John's College, Oxford
Alumni of Ripon College Cuddesdon
People educated at Winchester College
Royal Navy chaplains